Chasmanthium latifolium, known as northern wood-oats, inland sea oats, northern sea oats, and river oats is a species of grass native to the central and eastern United States, Manitoba, and northeastern Mexico; it grows as far north as Pennsylvania and Michigan, where it is a threatened species.  The species was previously classified as Uniola latifolia (André Michaux).

Description
Chasmanthium latifolium is a warm-season, rhizomatous, perennial grass with stems about 1 m [3 feet] tall. The plant typically grows in wooded areas and riparian zones.

Gardens

It is used in landscaping in North America, where it is noted as a relatively rare native grass that thrives in partial shade; the plant is recommended for USDA hardiness zones 3–9 in acidic sands, loams, and clays.

Ecology
It is a larval host plant for the Northern Pearly-Eye, and its seeds are food for birds and mammals.  It is also eaten by the caterpillars of the pepper and salt skipper, Bell's roadside skipper, and bronzed roadside skipper butterflies.

References

External links
USDA Plant Profile Chasmanthium latifolium

Panicoideae
Grasses of Mexico
Grasses of the United States
Flora of Northeastern Mexico
Flora of the Eastern United States
Flora of the United States
Flora of the South-Central United States
Flora of the Southwestern United States
Flora of the Great Lakes region (North America)
Plants described in 1803
Taxa named by André Michaux
Garden plants of North America
Flora without expected TNC conservation status